Ballyhuppahane, also spelt Ballyhuppahaun, is a townland in County Laois, Ireland.

Features
Ballyhuppahane is situated in the Slieve Bloom Mountains and there are a number of walks nearby. Most of the area is covered in forest. The trees were planted by local farmers on marginal land unsuitable for farming. The neighbourhood of Ballyhuppahane has some recreational areas such as the Cathole Falls.

See also
 List of towns and villages in Ireland

References

External links
 Ordnance Survey of Ireland, maps of Ballyhuppahane

Townlands of County Laois